New Writings in SF 10 is an anthology of science fiction short stories edited by John Carnell, the tenth volume in a series of thirty, of which he edited the first twenty-one. It was first published in hardcover by Dennis Dobson in 1967, followed by a paperback edition by Corgi the same year.

The book collects seven novelettes and short stories by various science fiction authors, with a foreword by Carnell. The first four stories were later reprinted in the American edition of New Writings in SF 8.

Contents
"Foreword" (John Carnell)
"The Imagination Trap" (Colin Kapp)
"Apple" (John Baxter)
"Robot's Dozen" (G. L. Lack)
"Birth of a Butterfly" (Joseph Green)
"The Affluence of Edwin Lollard" (Thomas M. Disch)
"A Taste for Dostoevsky" (Brian W. Aldiss)
"Image of Destruction" (John Rankine)

External links

1967 anthologies
10